Tomaž Ocvirk is a Slovenian handball coach for RK Celje.

See also
European Handball Federation
Sport in Slovenia

References

Slovenian handball coaches
Living people
Year of birth missing (living people)
Place of birth missing (living people)